Spezzano Albanese (Arbëreshë: Spixan) is a municipality in the province of Cosenza, Calabria, southern Italy.

It is located on a 320 m high hill commanding the plain of Sibari and the Esaro river valley. It originated from Albanian emigration in the 15th century. Sights include the archaeological site of Torre del Mordillo, whose excavated Bronze Age remains and a necropolis dating from the 18th century BC up to the early Hellenistic Age; the Torre Scribla, what remains of a Norman fortress originally including two towers;which was the first residence / Fief of Robert Guiscard the future Duke of Calabria and Puglia, on his arrival in Calabria and the Sanctuary of Madonna delle Grazie, a Catholic church from the 16th century.

References

Sources

External links
Linguistical Portal of Spezzano Albanese 

Arbëresh settlements